Sky Nature is a British pay television channel owned and operated by Sky, a division of Comcast, which launched on 27 May 2020. Sky Nature broadcasts original Sky content, content from Canadian channel Love Nature, and Sky's collection of David Attenborough programming.

History
The launch of the channel was used to help bring High dynamic range (HDR) content to Sky Q.

When Love Nature was removed from Virgin Media in December 2020, most of its former content moved to Sky Nature.

Sky Nature launched an Irish feed on 8 April 2021. The channel is registered with the broadcasting regulator in Luxembourg however, the Luxembourg regulator will make use of the classification system set by Ireland's BAI Code of Program Standards. The channel is currently only available in standard definition.

On 1 July 2021 Fox closed and Sky Nature moved into its place on channel 124 on Sky.

Programming
Sky Nature currently broadcast a variety of nature series, both on the live TV feed and on demand:
Extreme Animals: One Wild Day
Extreme Animals: Life’s First Steps
Amazing Animal Friends
Wild Tales from the Farm
Shark with Steve Backshall
Monkey Life
Gangs of Lemur Island
Wild Israel

Branding
The logo consists of the Sky logo coloured green followed by the word "nature" on a green background. The logo originally consisted of a bunch of leaves forming the background where the "nature" text is. It was later changed green.

International version
On 1 July 2021 Sky Nature was launched in Italy, alongside Sky Documentaries, Sky Investigation (the local version of Sky Witness) and Sky Serie.

See also
 List of television stations in the United Kingdom

References

Sky television channels
Television channels and stations established in 2020
English-language television stations in the United Kingdom
Television channels in the United Kingdom
2020 establishments in the United Kingdom